Rodney Allen Leisle (born February 5, 1981 in Fresno, California) is a former American football defensive tackle. He was drafted by the New Orleans Saints in the fifth round of the 2004 NFL Draft. He attended Ridgeview High School in Bakersfield, California and played college football at UCLA. 

Leisle has also been a member of the New York Giants, Saskatchewan Roughriders and Arizona Cardinals.

Career
Leisle played in 18 games for the Saints and appeared in one game for his last season with Saints before being placed on injured reserve with a knee injury. Saints cut Leisle in their 2007 training camp.

Leisle resurfaced with the Giants during their training camp in 2008, but sustained a season ending rib injury before season started. He spent some time in Canadian football with the Saskatchewan Roughriders during their 2008 season. He competed for a roster spot during Cardinals training camp in 2009.

Lesile was signed again to the Saints in 2009 before being released again in 2010.

References

External links
Arizona Cardinals bio
New York Giants bio
UCLA Bruins bio

1981 births
Living people
Sportspeople from Fresno, California
Players of American football from California
American football defensive tackles
American players of Canadian football
Canadian football defensive linemen
UCLA Bruins football players
New Orleans Saints players
New York Giants players
Saskatchewan Roughriders players
Arizona Cardinals players